Liriodendron is a historic home and estate located at Bel Air, Harford County, Maryland, United States. It was the summer home of Laetitia and Dr Howard Kelly, a successful surgeon and founding member of the Johns Hopkins Medical College, and comprises the mansion named Liriodendron; the Graybeal-Kelly House; a c. 1835 bank barn; a c. 1898 carriage house; a c. 1850 board-and-batten cottage; and five other outbuildings including a corn crib, a smokehouse, two ice houses, and a shed. The -story, stuccoed brick mansion was designed by the Baltimore architectural firm of Wyatt and Nolting in the Georgian Revival style and constructed about 1898. The -story Georgian-style Graybeal-Kelly House, built about 1835, was the manor house for the farm until the mansion was constructed. It is used as a wedding, conference, and arts facility.

Liriodendron was listed on the National Register of Historic Places in 1980.

References

External links
The Liriodendron Foundation, Inc. website
, including photo from 1979, Maryland Historical Trust website
Liriodendron, 502 West Gordon Street, Bel Air, Harford, MD at the Historic American Buildings Survey (HABS)
Liriodendron, Barn, 502 West Gordon Street, Bel Air, Harford, MD at HABS

Houses on the National Register of Historic Places in Maryland
Houses in Bel Air, Harford County, Maryland
Houses completed in 1835
Georgian architecture in Maryland
Georgian Revival architecture in Maryland
Colonial Revival architecture in Maryland
Historic American Buildings Survey in Maryland
Art museums and galleries in Maryland
National Register of Historic Places in Harford County, Maryland